Patrobus atrorufus is a species of ground beetle native to Europe.

References

Patrobus
Beetles described in 1768
Beetles of Europe
Taxa named by Hans Strøm